Guiding Spirit is a live album by guitarist Kenny Burrell's quartet featuring vibraphonist Jay Hoggard recorded at the Village Vanguard in New York in 1989 and released on the Contemporary label.

Reception

The Allmusic review by Scott Yanow noted "This "live at the Village Vanguard" CD has a combination that works ... This strong straightahead outing is one of Kenny Burrell's better sets from the past decade".

Track listing 
 "Calling You" (Bob Telson) – 9:10
 "Main Stem" (Duke Ellington) – 6:04
 "In a Sentimental Mood" (Ellington. Manny Kurtz, Irving Mills) – 4:50
 "Moment's Notice" (John Coltrane) – 4:32
 "Guiding Spirit" (Jay Hoggard) – 6:50
 "Soul Eyes" (Mal Waldron) – 7:48
 "Midnight Blue" (Kenny Burrell) – 4:39	
 "In Walked Bud" (Thelonious Monk) – 4:22
 "Gift for You" (Yoron Israel) – 7:31 Additional track on CD release

Personnel 
Kenny Burrell – guitar, arranger
Jay Hoggard – vibraphone, arranger
Marcus McLaurine – bass
Yoron Israel – drums, arranger

References 

Kenny Burrell live albums
1990 live albums
Contemporary Records live albums
Albums recorded at the Village Vanguard